The 1928 New Year Honours were appointments by King George V to various orders and honours to reward and highlight good works by citizens of the United Kingdom and British Empire. They were announced on 30 December 1927.

Unusually, only women were named as recipients of the Order of the British Empire in the 1928 New Year Honours.

The recipients of honours are displayed here as they were styled before their new honour, and arranged by honour, with classes (Knight, Knight Grand Cross, etc.) and then divisions (Military, Civil, etc.) as appropriate.

United Kingdom and Colonies

Baron
Lieutenant-Colonel the Right Honourable George Abraham Gibbs  Member of Parliament for Bristol West since 1906; a Government Whip in the House of Commons. 1917; Treasurer of His Majesty's Household 1921 to January, 1924, and since November, 1924.
The Right Honourable Sir Frederick John Dealtry Lugard  Former Governor General of Nigeria. British Member of Permanent Mandates Commission of the League of Nations since 1922.
Sir Gerald Strickland  Member of Parliament for Lancaster since 1924. Prime Minister of Malta.

Privy Councillor
The King appointed the following to His Majesty's Most Honourable Privy Council:
John Colin Campbell Davidson  Member of Parliament for Hemel Hempstead, Nov. 1920–1923, and since 1924; Chairman of the Conservative and Unionist Party since Nov. 1926; Chancellor of the Duchy of Lancaster, 1923–24; Parliamentary and Financial Secretary to the Admiralty, Nov. 1924.
Sir Kingsley Wood  Member of Parliament Woolwich West Division since Dec. 1918; Parliamentary Secretary to the Ministry of Health since Nov. 1924.

Baronetcies
James Gomer Berry  Chairman, St. Clements Press Ltd., Deputy Chairman Allied Newspapers Ltd.
James Caird. For public and philanthropic services.
Major-General Sir Richard Havelock Charles  Serjeant Surgeon to H.M. The King. Late President, Medical Board, India Office.
Colonel William Edward Carne Curre  For political and public services in Monmouthshire.
Sir Arthur Worley  General Manager of the North British and Mercantile Insurance Company, and of the Railway Passengers Assurance Company.

Aide-de-Camp
Captain, the Marquess of Dufferin and Ava  has been appointed a Royal Naval Volunteer Reserve Aide-de-Camp to the King, in succession to Captain Viscount Curzon  2 January 1928.

Knight Bachelor

Stephen Harry Aitchison  For political and public services in Northumberland. President of the Central Division Conservative Association, Newcastle upon Tyne.
George Washington Badgerow  Dean and Surgeon to the Hospital for Diseases of the Throat and Ear, Golden Square, W. 1, Consulting Surgeon to various Dominion Hospitals in England.
Edmund Broughton Barnard  Chairman of the Hertfordshire County Council and Lee Conservancy Board. For valuable services to local government.
Alderman John Bayley. Founder and Builder of Wellington College, now Wrekin College, Salop. Has been on the Shropshire County Council since 1889.
Reginald Bennett. For political and public services. Secretary of the Primrose League.
Frederick Charles Bowring  Lord Mayor of Liverpool 1925–27. For public services.
John Reeve Brooke  Formerly Permanent Secretary, Ministry of Transport. Secretary, Central Electricity Board.
Arthur William Faire  For political and public services in Leicestershire. Chairman of the Melton Division Conservative and Unionist Association.
Montagu Richard William Foster  For political and public services in Hampshire. County Alderman, County of Southampton.
Edward German, Composer 
His Honour Judge Peter Grain, Judge of the Supreme Court for China.
His Honour Judge Francis John Greenwell  County Court Judge.
Frederic Greville Hallett  Secretary, Joint Examining Board, Royal College of Physicians of London, and Royal College of Surgeons of England.
Brigadier-General Harold Brewer Hartley  Fellow and Tutor of Balliol College, Oxford. Member of Chemical Warfare Committee. For services to the Army in connection with training Army candidates at Oxford.
Alderman Marshall Hays. For political and public services in Hammersmith.
Charles Igglesden  President of the Institute of Journalists, 1927.
George William Henry Jones  Member of Parliament for Stoke Newington, 1918–23, and since 1924. For political and public services.
Arthur Belmore Lowry  Chief General Inspector, Ministry of Health.
David McCowan  For political and public services in Glasgow.
Mortimer Reginald Margesson  For political and public services in Worcestershire. Chairman of the Kidderminster Division Conservative and Unionist Association.
David Mason  Lord Provost of Glasgow.
William Maxwell. For political and public services in the North East of Scotland.
Major Robert Spencer Nairn  For political and public services in the East of Scotland.
Charles Grant Robertson  Vice Chancellor and Principal of Birmingham University.
Alderman James Robinson  For public and political services in Cardiff.
Percy William George Sargent  Honorary Consultant Surgeon, Ministry of Pensions. Specialist in cases of injury to brain and spinal cord.
Meyer Adam Spielman, Chairman of Managers of Hayes Industrial School and of Park House Reformatory School.
Thomas Ernest Stanton  Superintendent, Engineering Department, National Physical Laboratory.
Alexander Stevenson  Lord Provost of Edinburgh. 
Walter Wooll West  For political and public services in the Isle of Ely.

Dominions
John Longstaff, President of Society of Australian Artists.
The Honourable Alfred Bishop Morine  Minister without Portfolio, Newfoundland.
Charles Samuel Nathan  Vice-Chairman of the Development and Migration Commission, Commonwealth of Australia.
The Honourable Thomas Walter Stringer, lately Judge of the Supreme Court of New Zealand.

British India
Saw Hke  Sawbwa of Hsipaw, Burma.
Justice Louis Charles Crump, Indian Civil Service, Puisne Judge of the High Court of Judicature, Bombay.
Justice Arthur Herbert Cuming, Indian Civil Service, Puisne Judge of the High Court of Judicature, Calcutta.
Albert Ashley Biggs, Agent, Madras and Southern Mahratta Railway.
Brojendra Lai Mitter, Advocate-General, Bengal. 
Edwin Hall Pascoe, Director, Geological Survey of India.
Byramjee Jeejeebhoy, Sheriff of Bombay.
Jehangir Cooverjee Coyajee, Professor of Political Economy and Philosophy in the Presidency College at Calcutta, lately Member of the Royal Commission on the Indian Tariff and Indian Currency.
Shapurji Bomanji Billimoria  lately Member of the Bombay Back Bay Committee.
Doctor William James Wanless, American Presbyterian Mission Hospital, Miraj, Bombay.

Colonies, Protectorates, etc.
Algernon Edward Aspinall  Secretary to the West India Committee.
Frank Morrish Baddeley  Chief Secretary to Government, Nigeria.
Clement Everitt, Unofficial Member of the Executive and Legislative Councils, Straits Settlements.
Richard Allmond Jeffrey Goode  lately Chief Secretary to Government, Northern Rhodesia.
William Alison Russell, Chief Justice, Tanganyika Territory.
Henry Milne Scott  Acting Attorney-General, Fiji. Member of the Executive and Legislative Councils, formerly Mayor of Suva.

The Most Honourable Order of the Bath

Knight Grand Cross of the Order of the Bath (GCB)
Military Division

Army
General Sir Archibald James Murray  Retired pay.
General Sir Alexander John Godley  General to The King, Colonel The Royal Ulster Rifles, General Officer Commanding-in-Chief, Southern Command.
General Sir Havelock Hudson  Retired pay, late. Indian Army, Colonel The Northamptonshire Regiment.
General Sir Alexander Stanhope Cobbe  Indian Army, Colonel The South Wales Borderers, General Officer Commanding-in-Chief, Northern Command, India.

Civil Division
The Right Honourable Sir John Eldon Bankes, Lord Justice of Appeal.

Knight Commander of the Order of the Bath (KCB)
Military Division
Royal Navy
Vice-Admiral Hugh Dudley Richards Watson 

Army
Major-General John Duncan  General Officer Commanding North China Command.
Lieutenant-General Sir Louis Ridley Vaughan  Unemployed List, Indian Army.

Companion of the Order of the Bath (CB)
Military Division
Royal Navy
Rear-Admiral Roger Roland Charles Backhouse 
Engineer Rear-Admiral Frederick William Sydenham 
Captain the Honourable Reginald Aylmer Ranfurly Plunkett-Ernle-Erle-Drax 

Army
Major-General James Stuart Gallie  late Royal Army Medical Corps, Deputy Director of Medical Services, Aldershot Command.
Colonel (temporary Colonel Commandant) Frederick William Henry Walshe  Colonel Commandant, Royal Artillery, Eastern and Western Commands, India.
Colonel Ladislaus Herbert Richard Pope-Hennessy  Military Attache, Washington.
Colonel Claude Bussell-Brown  Chief Engineer, South China Command.
Colonel John Greer Dill  Instructor Imperial Defence College.
Colonel Walter Mansel Parker  Deputy Director of Transport, Army Headquarters, India.
Colonel (temporary Colonel Commandant) Patrick Barclay Sangster  Indian Army, Brigade Commander, 9th (Jhansi) Infantry Brigade, India.
Colonel (temporary Colonel Commandant) Edward Currie Alexander  Indian Army, Brigade Commander, 4th (Quetta) Infantry Brigade, India.
Colonel (temporary Colonel Commandant) Richard Gardiner  Indian Army, Brigade Commander, 3rd (Jhelum) Infantry Brigade, India.
Colonel Charles Henry Kemble Chauncy  Indian Army, Deputy Director of Movements and Quartering, Army Headquarters, India.

Royal Air Force
Air Commodore Hugh Caswall Tremenheere Dowding 

Civil Division
Captain Llewellyn Evan Hugh Llewellyn  (Retired).
Commander Thomas Joseph Croker  (Retired).
James Alan Noel Barlow  Principal Assistant Secretary, Industrial Relations Department, Ministry of Labour.
Arthur Stretton Gaye  Commissioner of Crown Lands.
William Thomas Leech, Director of Telegraphs and Telephones, General Post Office.
Henry Aufrere Leggett  Director of Establishments, Ministry of Health.
Lewis McQuibban  Permanent Secretary, Ministry. of Education, Northern Ireland.

The Most Exalted Order of the Star of India

Knight Commander (KCSI)
Sir Bhupendra Nath Mitra  Member of the Governor-General's Executive Council.
Sir Samuel Perry O'Donnell  Indian Civil Service, Member of the Executive Council of the Governor of the United Provinces.
Sir Chunilal Vijbhukhandas Mehta, Member of the Executive Council of the Governor of Bombay.

Companion (CSI)
Charles Cunningham Watson  Indian Civil Service, Political Secretary to the Government of India.
Lieutenant-Colonel Terence Humphrey Keyes  Political Department.
Robert John Sherwood Dodd. Inspector-General of Police, United Provinces.
Major Henry George Vaux  Military Secretary to His Excellency the Governor of Bombay.

The Most Distinguished Order of Saint Michael and Saint George

Knight Grand Cross of the Order of St Michael and St George (GCMG)
Sir Graeme Thomson  Governor and Commander-in-Chief of Nigeria.

Knight Commander of the Order of St Michael and St George (KCMG)

Lieutenant-Colonel Sir Edward William Macleay Grigg  Governor and Commander-in-Chief of Kenya Colony.
Edward John Harding  Assistant Under-Secretary of State, Dominions Office.
Major Charles William James Orr  Governor and Commander-in-Chief of the Bahama Islands.
The Honourable Philip Whistler Street, Chief Justice of the Supreme Court, State of New South Wales.

Companion of the Order of St Michael and St George (CMG)
Major Robert George Archibald  Director of the Wellcome Tropical Research Laboratories, Khartoum.
Henry Sinclair Campbell Budge, Official Secretary to the Governor and Clerk to the Executive Council, State of New South Wales.
George Craig, Comptroller of Customs, Dominion of New Zealand.
Albert Fuller Ellis, New Zealand Member of the British Phosphate Commission.
Odin Tom Faulkner, Director of Agriculture, Nigeria.
Alexander Flint  Principal Assistant Secretary, Admiralty.
William Alfred Cecil Goodchild, Assistant Delegate and General Secretary of the British Delegation to the Reparation Commission.
Alexander William Keown-Boyd  Director-General of the European Department of the Ministry of the Interior, Cairo.
Percy Alexander Koppel  Counsellor in the Foreign Office. William Peters, late of His Majesty's Mission at Moscow.
Robert Frier Jardine  Administrative Inspector, Ministry of the Interior, Iraq.
Lewis Francis Mizzi  Senior Member of the Bar, Malta, formerly Member of the Legislative Assembly; in recognition of his public services.
Herbert Phillips  Inspector General of Consular Establishments in the Far East.
Francis Graeme Tyrrell, Controller of Revenue, Ceylon.
Major Francis Walter Fitton Jackson  Provincial Commissioner, Eastern Province, Gold Coast.
Cyril Legh Winser  Private Secretary to the Governor, State of South Australia.
Edward Dudley Corscaden Wolfe, Captain Superintendent of Police, Hong Kong.
Ernest Charteris Holford Wolff, British resident, Negri Sembilan, Federated Malay States

Order of the Indian Empire

Knight Commander (KCIE)
His Highness Maharaja Vishvanath Singh Bahadur, Maharaja of Chhatarpur.
Norman Edward Marjoribanks  Indian Civil Service, Member of the Executive Council of the Governor of Madras.
Sir Edward Grimwood Mears, Chief Justice of the High Court of Judicature, Allahabad.

Companion (CIE)
Andrew Gourlay Clow, Indian Civil Service, Officiating Secretary to the Government of India in the Department of Industries and Labour.
William David Russell Prentice, Indian Civil Service, Chief Secretary to the Government of Bengal.
Alan Hubert Lloyd, Indian Civil Service, Member of the Central Board of Revenue.
Arthur Terence Stowell, Acting Agent, North-Western Railway.
Hyde Clarendon Gowan, Indian Civil Service, Chief Secretary to Government, Central Provinces.
Colonel (Temporary Colonel-on-the-Staff) Cecil Charles Palmer  Deputy Master-General of Supply and Director of Artillery, Army Headquarters.
James Hezlett, Indian Civil Service, Officiating Commissioner, Surma Valley and Hill Divisions, Assam.
George Townsend Boag, Indian Civil Service, Secretary to Government, Finance Department, Madras.
Charles William Aldis Turner, Indian Civil Service, Secretary to the Government of Bombay in the General, Educational and Marine Departments.
Lieutenant-Colonel Cuthbert Lindsay Dunn, Indian Medical Service, Director of Public Health, United Provinces.
Arthur Ralph Astbury, Chief Engineer, Public Works Department, Punjab.
John Nesbitt Gordon Johnson, Indian Civil Service, Deputy Commissioner of Delhi.
Major Claude Ernest Torin Erskine  Indian Army.
Major Richard Outram Chamier, Private Secretary to His Excellency the Governor of the United Provinces.
Edward Henry Berthoud  Indian Civil Service, Commissioner of Excise and Salt, and Inspector-General of Registration, Bihar and Orissa.
Ralph Albert Horton, Superintendent of Police, United Provinces.
Walchand Hirachand Doshi, Bombay.
Dinshah Fardunji Mulla, Advocate, Bombay High Court.
George Morgan, Member of the Legislative Council, Bengal.
Rai Bahadur Mahendra Chandra Mitra, Vakil, Bengal.
Bao Bahadur Raja Hari Singh, of Mahajan, of Bikaner, Rajputana.
Kheng Beng Chong.
Frederick William Thomas, lately Librarian, India Office, London.

The Royal Victorian Order

Knight Grand Cross of the Royal Victorian Order (GCVO)
Charles Henry Alexander, Marquess of Anglesey
Sir Norman Fenwick Warren Fisher

Knight Commander of the Royal Victorian Order (KCVO)
Sir Edward Elgar 
Sir Frank Baines 
Colonel Clive Wigram 
Lieutenant-Colonel Arthur d'Arcy Gordon Bannerman 
Lionel Cust  (dated 17 December 1927).

Commander of the Royal Victorian Order (CVO)
Sir Frederick Macmillan.
Alexander Gordon Ingram  (dated 6 July 1927).

Member of the Royal Victorian Order, 4th class (MVO)
Frank Herbert Mitchell  
Ex-Bailie William Brownhill Smith  (Glasgow).
Treasurer James Stewart  (Glasgow).
Bailie Peter Harvey Allan (Edinburgh).
Lieutenant-Commander George Griffiths  (dated 7 August 1927).
The Revd. John Stirton  (dated 4 October 1927).

Member of the Royal Victorian Order, 5th class (MVO)
George David Field.
Jocelyn Godefroi.
Basil Hinton Philpott.
John Gwyndeg Hughes-Roberts.

Order of Merit (OM)

The Most Excellent Order of the British Empire

Only women were named as recipients of the Order of the British Empire in this list.

Dame Grand Cross of the Order of the British Empire (GBE)

Dame Commander of the Order of the British Empire (DBE)
Mary Du Caurroy, Duchess of Bedford  For public services.
Jane Frances Dove  former Headmistress of St. Leonards School, St. Andrews.

Commander of the Order of the British Empire (CBE)
Annie Rosalie Collin, Secretary of the Friends of the Poor Society.
Ellen Mary Musson  Chairman of the General Nursing Council.
Violet Mary Craig Roberton  Bailie of City of Glasgow.

Officer of the Order of the British Empire (OBE)
Eleanor Martha Barker, Honorary Secretary and Treasurer of the St. Barnabas Hostels and Pilgrimage Fund.
Edith Broadbent, Member of East and Mid-Sussex War Pensions Committee. For valuable public services as voluntary worker in administration of War Pensions.
Isabel Brogden Carter, Member of the Cheshire Mental Deficiency Committee.
Jeannette Halford, Founder and Honorary Secretary of the National League for Health, Maternity and Child Welfare.
Essie Margaret Harris  For public and political services in Swansea.
Rosalie Alice Jane Henderson, Vice Chairman, East Cumberland War Pensions Committee. For valuable public services as voluntary worker in administration of War Pensions.
Mary Mitchell Thorburn  Matron of the London County Mental Hospital, Horton.

Member of the Order of the British Empire (MBE)
Agnes Jane Chalmers, Member of Bromley, Sevenoaks and District War Pensions Committee. For valuable public services as voluntary worker in administration of War Pensions.
Ada Davies, Lady Superintendent Plaistow Maternity Hospital.
Frances Isabella Hepburn, Secretary and Treasurer of the Edinburgh Branch of the Society for the Prevention of Cruelty to Children.
Margaret Elizabeth Shelton-Jones, Member of Warrington, Widnes and District War Pensions Committee. For valuable public services as voluntary worker in administration of War Pensions.
Jane Mottershead, Senior Assistant Matron, Cheshire County Mental Hospital, Macclesfield.
Florence Elizabeth Pearse, Inspector of Midwives and Superintendent of Health Visitors, Oxford.
Hannah Ada Turner, Member of Bristol and District War Pensions Committee. For valuable public services as voluntary worker in administration of War Pensions.

Colonies, Protectorates, etc.
Margaret Sloan, lately Principal Matron. Government Medical Department, Hong Kong.

Kaisar-i-Hind Medal
First Class
Margaret Evelyn, Viscountess Goschen, Madras. 
Iravati Mehta, Benares. 
Captain James Edward Corbett, Nainital.
Edris Griffin, Superintendent, Lady Reading Health School, Delhi.
Anne Strahan Graham, Superintendent, Lady Reading Health School, Delhi.
The Reverend John Newcomb, American Baptist Missionary, Madras.
Brother Gregory, Head Master, Marist Brothers School, Aden.
Ellen Margaret Farrer, Medical Missionary, Zenana Baptist Mission, Punjab.

Air Force Cross

Flight Lieutenant Charles Roderick Carr 
Flight Lieutenant Robert Linton Ragg.

Air Force Medal
Flight Sergeant (Pilot) Francis Hubert Pelham Simpson 
Sergeant (Pilot) David Kinnear.

King's Police Medal (KPM)

For a Bar to the King's Police Medal
British India
Munshi Yusuf Hussain, Sub-Inspector, United Provinces Police.
Geoffrey Bernard Sandeman Prance, Superintendent, Punjab Police.
Ch. Mahmud Khan, Sub-Inspector, Punjab Police.

His Majesty has also graciously consented to a bar to the King's Police Medal being handed to the next-of-kin of the undermentioned officer, who died on the 26th December, 1926, and who would have received the decoration had he survived:
Harry Rivett Cecil Guise  Superintendent, Bihar and Orissa Police.

England and Wales
Lieutenant-Colonel Frank Augustus Douglas Stevens  Chief Constable of Bedfordshire.
John William A. Danby, Chief Constable of Hyde Borough Police.
William Jones  Chief Superintendent and Deputy Chief Constable, Glamorgan County Police.
Philip Fermer Ambrose  Chief Superintendent, Kent County Police.
William Banister, Superintendent, Lancashire County Police.
Thomas Jackson, Superintendent, Warwick County Police.
Thomas William Hill, Superintendent and Deputy Chief Constable, Worcester County Police.
Alfred Clay den, Sergeant, Metropolitan Police.
Henry Pegler, Sergeant, Metropolitan Police.
Duncan Dunn, Constable, Metropolitan Police.
George Hainsby, Constable, Metropolitan Police.
William Marshall, Constable, Metropolitan Police.
Percival Roberts, Constable, Metropolitan Police.
Frederick Stone, Constable, Metropolitan Police.
Albert Turpin, Constable, Metropolitan Police.
Charles Young Brown, Constable, Devon County Police.
George Brothwood, Constable, Lancashire County Police.
Thomas Johnson, Constable, Lancashire County Police.
James Edward Dainty, Constable, Nottingham County Police.
George Edwin Beaton, Constable, Somerset County Police.
Edwin John Pollington, Con-stable, Dover Borough Police.
John Harold Clarke, Constable, Liverpool City Police.
William Henry Smith, Constable, Liverpool City Police.
Frank Leech, Constable, Salford Borough Police.

Fire Brigade
Captain Henry John Butler  Superintendent and Chief Officer, Wimbledon Fire Brigade.

Scotland
Neil McLennan  Chief Constable, Dumbarton County Police.
Charles Cheyne  Chief Constable, Hamilton Burgh Police.
William Robb, Chief Constable, Renfrew Burgh Police.
David Happell  Superintendent and Deputy Chief Constable, Ayr County Police.
John Syme, Superintendent and Deputy.
Chief Constable, Lanark County Police.
Graham C. Henderson, Constable, Glasgow City Police.
Arthur Williamson, Constable, Glasgow City Police.

Northern Ireland
Henry George Slack, Head Constable, Royal Ulster Constabulary.

Australia
Stephen Condon, lately Inspector of Police and Officer in Charge of the Criminal Investigation Branch of the Western Australian Police Department.
Robert Morrison Larsen, Constable, Western Australian Police Force.

Union of South Africa
John Christian Hoehler, First Class Constable, South African Police.

British India
Lionel Bell Gasson, Deputy-Commissioner, Madras Police.
William Lane Kynaston Herapath, Superintendent, Bombay Police.
Chintaman Mahadeo Mate, Inspector, Bombay Police.
Shaikh Kifayat Shaikh Ajam, Sub-Inspector, Bombay Police. 
Tuni Meerza, Superintendent, Bengal Police.
Richard Ernest Coupland, Deputy Inspector-General, United Provinces Police.
Tejasvi Prasad Bhalla, Assistant Superintendent, United Provinces Police.
Thakur Moti Singh, Sub-Inspector, United Provinces Police.
Munshi Nadir Ali Khan, Sub-Inspector, United Provinces Police.
Teja Singh, Officiating Deputy Superintendent, Punjab Police.
Gerald Charles Routh Herdon, Superintendent, Punjab Police.
Harold George Bussell, Assistant Superintendent., Punjab Police.
Major Cyril de Montfort Wellborne  Officiating Inspector-General, Burma Police.
Mohamed Saddiq Khan, Constable, Burma Police.
Captain John Francis Bowerman  Assistant Commandant, Burma Military Police.
Mirza Yusuf Beg, Retired Constable, Bihar and Orissa Police.
Jagat Narain Singh, Constable, Bihar arid Orissa Police.
Bhagwan Pershad, Inspector, Central Provinces Police.
Ghulam Muhammad, Head Constable, North-West Frontier Province Police.
Khan Bahadur Tasadduq Husain  Superintendent of Police, Intelligence Bureau, Home Department, Government of India.

Colonies, Protectorates and Mandated Territories 
Muni wa Mutumbi, First Class Constable, Kenya Police.
Major George Herbert Kirkham  Deputy Commissioner of Police and Prisons, Tanganyika Territory.
Lieutenant-Colonel William Henry Wyndham Murphy  Commandant of the Zanzibar Police Force.
Arthur Harold Dickinson, Assistant Superintendent of Police, Straits Settlements.
Kenneth Walter Andrew, Sub-Inspector, Hong Kong Police Force.
Marcos Antoniou, Inspector, Cyprus Police.
Ahmed Izzet Hassan, Inspector, Cyprus Police.
Kyriaco Gavriel Zaptieh, Cyprus Police.
William Samuel Hay, Sergeant-Major, Jamaica Constabulary.
Captain Patrick Ruane, lately Inspector, Leeward Islands Police Admiralty, R.N.V.R.

References

New Year Honours
1928 in Australia
1928 in India
1928 in New Zealand
1928 in the United Kingdom
1928 awards